Amigos x siempre (English title: Friends 4 Ever) is a Mexican children's telenovela produced by Rosy Ocampo for Televisa that premiered on January 10, 2000 and ended on June 16, 2000.

Adriana Fonseca (later replaced by Lourdes Reyes) and Ernesto Laguardia starred as protagonists, Belinda and Martín Ricca starred as child protagonists, while Odiseo Bichir, Rebeca Mankita and the leading actor Germán Robles starred as antagonists. The leading actress Carmen Montejo starred as stellar performance.

The story is set at a prestigious, but rigid and repressive school called Instituto Vidal. Its strict owner and headmistress, Julia Vidal, was once kind but has now turned into a bitter woman following the death of her husband and her daughter, Laura.

Her granddaughter, Ana, a very sweet and intelligent 10-year-old, also has been affected by the death. She has been rendered virtually speechless by the trauma, though she expresses herself through music and possesses an extraordinary ability to move objects with her mind. Ana's unscrupulous father, Francisco Capistrán, however, has taken advantage of the situation to try to steal Julia's school.

The timely arrival of Ana's uncle, Salvador, Amanda and her adopted son changes everything. Ana's sad and lonely life takes an unexpected turn for the better and she regains her joy in a series of adventures bursting with humor, excitement, music, and thrilling surprises.

Plot 
A group of children from a variety of backgrounds form a special friendship, using music as their bond. Ana, an abused child deep in sadness, is taught how to laugh by Pedro. Pedro, a fish out-of-water, refuses to follow the rigid rules of the school and loves to sing. The group includes, Santiago, a little rich kid, spoiled and raised by a maid, Lourdes, a shy girl, who devotes most of her time attending her Down Syndrome brother, Carlitos, Patricia a lonely girl who dreams of becoming rich, at any cost, Gilberto stutters constantly, causing shame to his self-absorbed parents, Renata, tries hard to win the affection of her father, whom believes that girls are worthless, so she tries to become a boy, "El 7 Leguas" a poor boy, who is not allowed to attend a prestigious school, he is loyal and inventive, Carlitos, born with Down Syndrome, tries hard to act normal and show everyone even mentally disabled children have feelings, care for others, and contribute to society, and Rafa, a chubby little boy, in love with Patricia has the brains, and is the songwriter in the group.

Cast 
 
 Ernesto Laguardia as Salvador Vidal Ruvalcaba
 Adriana Fonseca as Melissa Escobar #1
 Belinda as Ana Capistrán Vidal
 Martín Ricca as Pedro Vidal Naredo
 Lourdes Reyes as Melissa Escobar #2
 Rebeca Mankita as Amanda Naredo de Vidal
 Carmen Montejo as Doña Julia Ruvalcaba Vda. de Vidal
 Odiseo Bichir as Francisco Capistrán
 Germán Robles as Neftalí Güemes
 Héctor Ortega as Crispín Ávila
 Yolanda Mérida as Brígida Escobar
Bárbara Ferré as "La Nena" de Sánchez-Gavito
Oscar Traven as Ernesto Sánchez-Gavito
Marcela Páez as Isabel Gamba de Egurrola
Juan Carlos Bonet as Javier Egurrola
Lucía Guilmáin as Teacher Victoria
Julio Mannino as Marcos
Vanessa Angers as Claudia Hernández
Humberto Dupeyrón as Teacher Arnulfo
Julio Monterde as Teacher Félix
Eugenio Bartilotti as Agent Hipólito "Triple Cero"
Lisette Sáez as Merlina
Francisco Rosell as Teacher Gonzalo
Susan Vohn as Laura Vidal Ruvalcaba de Capistrán
Maripaz García as Elizabeth
 Christopher von Uckermann as Santiago del Valle Villareal
Daniela Mercado as Lourdes Egurrola Gamba
Grisel Margarita as Patricia Hernández
Mickey Santana as Gilberto Sánchez-Gavito
Naydelin Navarrete as Renata Sánchez-Gavito
Oscar Larios as Juan "El 7 Leguas"
Pablo Tableros as Carlitos Egurrola Gamba
Ronald Duarte as Rafa Núñez Saldívar
 Amparo Arozamena as Doña Virginia
Gerardo Camarena as Agent Doble Cero
Jose Magaña as Hans
 Oscar Morelli as Máximo
Mariagna Prats as Olga
Juan Carlos Casasola as Fernando
Héctor Gómez as Alfonso
Alfonso Mier y Terán as Nico
Queta Lavat as Mother Superior
Dolores Salomón "Bodokito" as Nun Pilar
Alberto Inzúa as Darío Ruiz Sandoval
 Alexis Ayala as Manuel Ruiz Sandoval
Raúl Magaña as Gerardo
Hernán Prado as Enrique Buendía
Pablo Poumian as Jaime Ávila "El Tocacintas"
Gabriel Ramos Villalpando as Alex
Enrique Sánchez as "El Nopal"
Montserrat Campos Rivera as "La Chilis"
Aarón González as "El Mocos"
Silvia Lomelí as Hostess of radio
 Ariel López Padilla as Himself
 Arturo Peniche as Himself
 Karla Álvarez as Herself
Yamil Sesin
Diego Sieres
Banda El Recodo
Tierra Cero

Discography 
 ¡Amigos X Siempre! (album)
 ¡Amigos x siempre! en la ruta de la amistad

Awards and nominations

International broadcast

References

External links
 in Televisa 

2000 telenovelas
Mexican telenovelas
2000 Mexican television series debuts
2000 Mexican television series endings
Spanish-language telenovelas
Television shows set in Mexico City
Televisa telenovelas
Children's telenovelas
Television series about children